Peter de Gildesburgh was the Archdeacon of Totnes from 1338 until 1349 .

References

Archdeacons of Totnes